Kilcooly or Kilcooley can refer to 

Kilcooly Abbey, County Tipperary
Kilcooly (civil parish), County Tipperary
Kilcooley estate, housing estate, County Down